Code of the Air is a 1928 American silent thriller film directed by James P. Hogan and starring Kenneth Harlan, June Marlowe and Arthur Rankin.

Cast
 Kenneth Harlan as Blair Thompson
 June Marlowe as Helen Carson
 Arthur Rankin as Alfred Clark
 William V. Mong as Professor Ross
 Paul Weigel as Doc Carson
 James Bradbury Jr. as Stuttering Slim
 Silver Streak as Silver Streak

References

Bibliography
 John T. Soister, Henry Nicolella & Steve Joyce. American Silent Horror, Science Fiction and Fantasy Feature Films, 1913-1929. McFarland, 2014.

External links
 

1928 films
1920s thriller films
1920s English-language films
American silent feature films
American thriller films
American black-and-white films
Films directed by James Patrick Hogan
1920s American films
Silent thriller films